The League for Socialist Action was a Trotskyist organization in Canada. It was known by several names throughout its history, including the International Left Opposition (Trotskyist) of Canada, the Workers Party of Canada, the Socialist Policy Group, the Socialist Workers League, the Revolutionary Workers Party, The Club, the Socialist Education League and the Socialist Information Centre.

Origins
The Canadian Trotskyist movement originated in the late 1920s as the left faction within the Communist Party of Canada. Maurice Spector, editor of the Communist Party newspaper The Worker, had been a Canadian delegate to the 1928 Comintern Congress in Moscow when he and American James Cannon inadvertently came across the suppressed platform of Trotsky's Left Opposition. Spector was won over to Trotsky's position and returned to Canada determined to build support for Trotsky in the party. He and his supporters were expelled 1928 and, with American Trotskyists, formed the Communist League of America and then a Canadian section called the International Left Opposition (Trotskyist) of Canada in 1932. Jack MacDonald, the expelled National Secretary of the Communist Party, joined. The Canadian Trotskyist movement went through a number of splits and reincarnations through the 1930s.

In 1934, most of the Montreal branch and about half a dozen members of the Toronto branch, led by William Krehm, left to form the Canadian section of the Organizing Committee for a Revolutionary Workers Party led by B. J. Field who had led a split from the Communist League of America. The Fieldite group, under Krehm's leadership in Canada, published Workers Voice and was, for a time, more active than the Trotskyists but faded away by the outbreak of World War II.

In 1934, the ILO, led by MacDonald and Spector, abandoned its attempts to reform the Communist Party of Canada and became the Workers Party of Canada, which published a monthly newspaper, The Vanguard. It became a fortnightly paper in 1935. The Workers Party also published a twice-monthly Ukrainian newspaper, Labor News, and a youth magazine called first October Youth and then Young Militant.

The party had serious disputes over the Trotskyist movement's orientation to the new social democratic party in Canada, the Co-operative Commonwealth Federation (CCF). In 1937, a majority of the Workers Party voted to join the CCF. They did so as the Socialist Policy Group, and published the newspaper Socialist Action. They were soon expelled from the CCF. They reunited with the faction that had opposed CCF work, and formed the Socialist Workers League in 1939 with Earle Birney as the principal leader as Macdonald and Spector had both dropped out of the movement.

World War II
The SWL was forced underground due to the implementation of the War Measures Act during World War II and their anti-war polemics which resulted in the group's publication being banned. The day after war was declared in 1939, SWL member Frank Watson became the first person arrested under the Defence of Canada Regulations when he denounced the war at a street corner meeting at Bloor and Brunswick in Toronto. Birney dropped out by 1942, according to Dowson because of his support for the war, and the group became inactive.

Revolutionary Workers Party
The group was relaunched in 1946 as the Revolutionary Workers Party (RWP), Canadian Section of the Fourth International, under the leadership of Ross Dowson. The foundations of the party had been laid two years earlier, in 1944, when Canadian supporters of the Fourth International met in Montreal for their first national convention. Dowson ran for mayor of Toronto as an open Trotskyist at the end of the war and won over 20% of the vote.

Entrism
In 1952, the RWP ceased its public activities, including the publication of Labour Challenge, and its members began to practice entrism in the CCF. During this period the group had no formal name but was known to members as The Club (Trotskyists in Britain practicing entrism during this period were also known as "The Club"). The next year, the section split reflecting the international split in the Fourth International between the International Committee of the Fourth International (ICFI) and the International Secretariat of the Fourth International (ISFI). The majority of the RWP, including Ross Dowson, backed James P. Cannon and the International Committee, while a minority, including Dowson's brother Murray and his brother-in-law Joe Rosenthal led a split from the Canadian section to form the Committee for the Socialist Regroupment of Canada in sympathy with Bert Cochran's split from the American SWP, siding with Pablo and the International Secretariat. They were informally known as the "Rose Group" (after Rosenthal's pseudonym) or as "Labour Forum", which was the name of the series of public meetings they held in Toronto for several years, often featuring writers associated with the US publication Monthly Review.

Members of the former RWP (whose National Committee did not dissolve and whose branches continued to hold meetings) had difficulty working within the CCF. Dowson's application for CCF membership was rejected while other ex-RWP members and their sympathisers found themselves facing persecution within the CCF.

Socialist Education League
In 1955, following the expulsion of 15 supporters from the CCF, the Toronto group reconstituted itself as the Socialist Education League (SEL), pledging itself to support the election of the CCF and with the goal of supporting the growth of the CCF's left wing. To this end, they resumed publication of a regular periodical, Workers Vanguard. Meanwhile, the Vancouver branch, which had developed some disagreements with its Toronto co-thinkers, became the Socialist Information Centre (SIC).

League for Socialist Action
In 1961, the SEL and SIC merged and became the League for Socialist Action (LSA), with branches in Toronto and Vancouver, with the intention of being the Marxist tendency within the newly formed New Democratic Party (itself a merger of the CCF and Canadian Labour Congress). The Young Socialists was set up as an "autonomous" youth wing at the same time and was active in the New Democratic Youth of Canada, though their members were expelled if discovered by the NDP which considered LSA or YS membership incompatible with membership in the NDP.

Outside Toronto near Orono, Ontario, the LSA had a camp property called Camp Poundmaker named after the famous Plains Cree leader. The camp song was a comic parody and it went like this: Camp Poundmaker's the place for me/Far away from the bourgeoise/Steady and true/I'll be to you/Loyal to the LSA-LSO/Raise on guard the red flag/Cheer it with all your might/Hurray for Camp Poundmaker/Hurray for Camp Poundmaker, maker, Camp Poundmaker!

The LSA marked the resumption of open Trotskyist activities in Canada after almost a decade of underground work. In 1964, a branch was established in Montreal under the name Ligue Socialiste Ouvrière with the YS setting up as well, using the name Ligue des Jeunes Socialistes.

Members of the LSA were involved in the Waffle movement of the NDP, from 1969 until the expulsion of the Waffle from the NDP in 1972. The LSA decided to remain in the NDP.

In 1972, Dowson stepped down as Executive Secretary of the LSA and was given the position of chairman while John Riddell became Executive Secretary.

In the early 1970s, the United Secretariat of the Fourth International (USFI, which was the result of a 1963 reconciliation between the ISFI and the ICFI) was riven by an international faction fight. The majority and leadership supported the USFI faction associated with the Socialist Workers Party (United States).

Supporters of Ernest Mandel, many of whom were active in the student movement, coalesced at the 1973 convention of the LSA as the Revolutionary Communist Tendency, a minority tendency that ultimately left the LSA to join the Revolutionary Marxist Group which supported Mandel internationally. Amongst its leadership, Alain Beiner, Ruth Bullock, Al Cappe, Joan Newbigging, John Riddell, Ernie Tate and Art Young were signatories of the 1973 Declaration of the Leninist Trotskyist Tendency, supporting the SWP position in the USFI. In 1976, Bullock, Riddell, Tate and Young, as well as Dowson (no longer a member of the LSA at this point) were among the signatories of a document, "The Verdict", supporting the SWP leadership against allegations made by Gerry Healey.

Dowson and his supporters, meanwhile, found themselves reduced to a minority within the LSA due to criticism of Dowson's sympathy with Canadian economic nationalism. They left the LSA in 1974 to form the "Socialist League" which became known as the "Forward Group" after the name of its publication.

In 1977, supporters of the Revolutionary Marxist Group and a separate Quebec organization, the Groupe Marxiste Revolutionnaire, united with the League for Socialist Action and the Ligue Socialiste Ouvrière to form the Revolutionary Workers League/Ligue Ouvrière Révolutionnaire which became the new Canadian section of the USFI.

Also in 1977, the League for Socialist Action ran Therese Faubert, one of the first two known LGBT candidates in Canadian history to run in a provincial election, as its candidate in Brampton for the 1977 Ontario provincial election.

See also
 League for Socialist Action (UK)

References

External links
 Canadian Socialist History Project
 Canadian Trotskyism 1928-61
 League for Socialist Action/Ligue Socialiste Ouvrière, 1961-1977
 Ross Dowson's web site edited by Forward Group, copyrighted owner 

Political parties established in 1932
Trotskyist organizations in Canada